Aubrey Ritchie (9 March 1925 – 26 December 1995) was a New Zealand cricketer. He played twelve first-class matches for Auckland between 1951 and 1960.

See also
 List of Auckland representative cricketers

References

External links
 

1925 births
1995 deaths
New Zealand cricketers
Auckland cricketers
Cricketers from Auckland